Pervoye Maya is the name of several inhabited localities in Russia.

Urban localities
Pervoye Maya, Nizhny Novgorod Oblast, a work settlement in Balakhninsky District of Nizhny Novgorod Oblast

Rural localities
Pervoye Maya, Astrakhan Oblast, a settlement in Privolzhsky District of Astrakhan Oblast
Pervoye Maya, Ivanovo Oblast, a village in the Furmanovsky District of Ivanovo Oblast
Pervoye Maya, name of several other rural localities